"Senza nuvole" is the fifth single of Alessandra Amoroso. It's the second single from Senza nuvole.

Track listing
Digital download/Standard
 "Senza nuvole" – 03:43

The song

The song is made available for digital download and radio airplay from October 16, 2009. Alessandra sang for the first time this song during the concert at the Limelight in Milan on October 8, while on October 10 she performed with this song at Amici di Maria De Filippi.

The music video

The video was produced by Pat Brown and includes scenes in which Alessandra sings and scenes from the film Amore 14, film in which Senza nuvole is the soundtrack.

Charts

Year-end charts

References

External links
 Senza nuvole Live @ Amici

Alessandra Amoroso songs
2009 singles
Pop ballads
Italian-language songs
2009 songs
Sony BMG singles